Ányelo Paolo Rodríguez Da Silva (born 28 July 1995) is a Uruguayan footballer who plays as a midfielder for Racing Club in the Uruguayan Primera División.

References

External links

1995 births
Living people
Racing Club de Montevideo players
Canadian Soccer Club players
Uruguayan Primera División players
Uruguayan Segunda División players
Uruguayan footballers
Association football midfielders